CBON-FM is a Canadian radio station. It broadcasts the Société Radio-Canada's Ici Radio-Canada Première network at 98.1 FM in Sudbury, Ontario. The station also serves much of Northern Ontario through a network of relay transmitters.

History
On July 28, 1975, the Canadian Broadcasting Corporation received approval from the CRTC to operate a new french-language FM station at Sudbury, Ontario on the frequency 98.1 MHz.

Prior to the station's launch in 1978, Radio-Canada programming was carried on private affiliate CFBR. The CRTC decision authorizing the launch of CBON-FM in fact encouraged, but did not direct, Radio-Canada to retain an AM frequency for its talk radio network, and to reserve CBON-FM for its music network. However, the station launched in 1978 as an affiliate of the talk network after the CBC was unable to negotiate an agreement with F. Baxter Ricard to directly acquire CFBR. Prior to CBON-FM's sign-on, CJBC Toronto simulcasted on most of the rebroadcast transmitters across northern Ontario.

Radio-Canada's music network was not available in the city until the launch of CBBX-FM in 2001, although from 1984 to 1991 the CBC held an unused license to launch that station.

Programming
The station's regional morning program is Le matin du Nord, weekdays from 6 a.m. to 9 a.m., and its regional afternoon program is Jonction 11-17, weekdays from 3:30 p.m. to 6 p.m. On Saturday mornings, the station airs the provincewide morning program À échelle humaine. The provincewide programs airs on CBON and CJBC, as well as CBEF in Windsor.

On all public holidays, either Pas comme d'habitude from CJBC in Toronto is heard provincewide (except Ottawa) from 3 p.m. to 6 p.m. On some holidays, Y'a pas deux matins pareils from CJBC or Le matin du Nord from CBON airs on both stations, but on some others holidays, both stations air their local shows as usual or both stations air Matins sans frontières from CBEF Windsor.

Transmitters

AM to FM and technical information
On February 28, 2017, the CBC submitted an application to convert CBON-6 1010 to 98.5 MHz. The callsign CBON-FM-6 was chosen for the new FM transmitter. The CRTC approved the CBC's application to move CBON-6 to 98.5 MHz on July 11, 2017.

In 2017, the CBC surrendered its licence for the low-power AM rebroadcaster CBON-10 1110 Matachewan. This makes CBON-12 Mattawa one of the last remaining low-power AM transmitters to rebroadcast CBON-FM Sudbury. No plans have been announced to either convert the Mattawa transmitter to the FM band or shutdown completely.

On August 19, 2021, the CRTC approved the CBC's application to increase the average effective radiated power (ERP) for CBON-FM-5 at 101.7 MHz Elliot Lake from 1,000 to 7,245 watts (maximum ERP from 2,640 to 17,622 watts), increasing the effective height of the antenna above average terrain from 141.0 to 165.3 metres.

References

External links
  Ici Radio-Canada Première

 

Bon
Bon
Bon
Radio stations established in 1978
1978 establishments in Ontario